Flight-time equivalent dose (FED) is an informal unit of measurement of ionizing radiation exposure. Expressed in units of flight-time (i.e., flight-seconds, flight-minutes, flight-hours), one unit of flight-time is approximately equivalent to the radiological dose received during the same unit of time spent in an airliner at cruising altitude. FED is intended as a general educational unit to enable a better understanding of radiological dose by converting dose typically presented in sieverts into units of time. FED is only meant as an educational exercise and is not a formally adopted dose measurement.

History
The flight-time equivalent dose concept is the creation of Ulf Stahmer, a Canadian professional engineer working in the field of radioactive materials transport. It was first presented in the poster session at the 18th International Symposium of the Packaging and Transport of Radioactive Materials (PATRAM) held in Kobe, Hyogo, Japan where the poster received an Aoki Award for distinguished poster presentation. In 2018, an article on FED appeared in the peer-reviewed journal The Physics Teacher.

Usage
Flight-time equivalent dose is an informal measurement, so any equivalences are necessarily approximate. It has been found useful to provide context between radiological doses received from various every-day activities and medical procedures.

Dose calculation
FED corresponds to the time spent in an airliner flying at altitude required to receive a corresponding radiological dose. FED is calculated by taking a known dose (typically in millisieverts) and dividing it by the average dose rate (typically in millisieverts per hour) at an altitude of 10,000 m, a typical cruising altitude for a commercial airliner.

While radiological dose at cruising altitudes varies with latitude, for FED calculations, the radiological dose rate at an altitude of 10,000 m has been standardized to be 0.004 mSv/h, about 15 times greater than the average dose rate at the Earth's surface. Using this technique, the FED received from a 0.01 mSv panoramic dental x-ray is approximately equivalent to 2.5 flight-hours; the FED received from eating one banana is approximately equal to 1.5 flight-minutes; and the FED received each year from naturally occurring background radiation (2.4 mSv/year) is approximately equivalent to 600 flight-hours.

Radiological exposures and limits

For comparison, a list of activities (including common medical procedures) and their estimated radiological exposures are tabulated below. Regulatory occupational dose limits for the public and radiation workers are also included. Items on this list are represented pictorially in the accompanying illustrations.

See also
 Background radiation
 Background radiation equivalent time
 Banana equivalent dose
 List of unusual units of measurement

References 

Units of radioactivity
Background radiation
Equivalent units